Interstate 475 (I-475)/State Route 475 (SR 475) was a proposed Interstate highway and state highway in Knox and Anderson counties, within the eastern part of the U.S. state of Tennessee. The proposed route would have allowed through traffic on I-75 to bypass the city of Knoxville. It was planned to begin at the I-40/I-75 split and travel northeast through the communities of Hardin Valley, Solway and Bull Run, then join I-75 again northwest of Heiskell.

Route description

I-475/SR-475 was proposed as a four-lane divided highway with full access control and a  design speed. Upon completion, this route was expected to be added into the National Highway System and would have also been designated as a Tennessee Scenic Parkway or State Scenic Highway. This route was also being studied by TDOT as a potential toll corridor and may have been planned to be extended to I-40 near mile marker 407. The route would have served as an outer bypass to Interstate 640.

History

With the idea originally conceived in the mid 1990s, the Knoxville Parkway was dubbed the "orange route" in the press. The route was cancelled on June 25, 2010 due to changing traffic needs and high cost. The "no build" option was selected because projections showed that it would divert less traffic from I-40/I-75 than previously expected, and the estimated one billion dollar expense was deemed prohibitive.

See also

References

External links
 KnoxvilleParkway.com
 Tennessee Department of Transportation

475
Cancelled highway projects in the United States
Freeways in Tennessee
Interstate 75